Hawatha Terrell Wade (born January 25, 1973) is an American former professional baseball pitcher who played in Major League Baseball.

Wade attended Hillcrest High School in Dalzell, South Carolina where he was teammates on the school's basketball team with Ray Allen. Wade played only one season of high school baseball team on a dare. After graduating in 1991, Wade worked a day job as a bricklayer. In the summer of 1991, he impressed Atlanta Braves scouts during a tryout and was signed to an amateur free agent contract.

Wade earned a World Series ring by pitching in three games in 1995, a total of four innings. His best season as a major leaguer was 1996 in which he pitched in 44 games, going 5-0 with an earned run average of 2.97.

He was selected by the Tampa Bay Devil Rays during the expansion franchise draft following the 1997 season (November 18, 1997; 60th overall). He pitched a total of 10.2 innings with the Devil Rays posting a 5.06 ERA and 2-2 record.

He spent all of 1998 with the Triple A Durham Bulls going 1-7 with a 9.49 ERA in 34 games. The following season he was signed by the Cincinnati Reds but spent all season in the minors.

Wade played in the independent leagues from 2003 to 2004 before retiring.

References

External links

1973 births
Living people
Tampa Bay Devil Rays players
Atlanta Braves players
St. Petersburg Devil Rays players
Louisville RiverBats players
Greenville Braves players
Richmond Braves players
Macon Braves players
Chattanooga Lookouts players
Durham Bulls players
Nashua Pride players
Atlantic City Surf players
Macon Peaches players
Gulf Coast Braves players
Major League Baseball pitchers
Baseball players from South Carolina
Pennsylvania Road Warriors players
People from Sumter County, South Carolina
African-American baseball players